The handicap principle is a hypothesis proposed by the biologist Amotz Zahavi to explain how evolution may lead to "honest" or reliable signalling between animals which have an obvious motivation to bluff or deceive each other. It suggests that costly signals must be reliable signals, costing the signaller something that could not be afforded by an individual with less of a particular trait. For example, in sexual selection, the theory suggests that animals of greater biological fitness signal this status through handicapping behaviour, or morphology that effectively lowers this quality. The central idea is that sexually selected traits function like conspicuous consumption, signalling the ability to afford to squander a resource. Receivers then know that the signal indicates quality, because inferior-quality signallers are unable to produce such wastefully extravagant signals.

History

The handicap principle was proposed in 1975 by Israeli biologist Amotz Zahavi.
The generality of the phenomenon is the matter of some debate and disagreement, and Zahavi's views on the scope and importance of handicaps in biology have not been accepted by the mainstream.  Nevertheless, the idea has been very influential, with most researchers in the field believing that the theory explains some aspects of animal communication.

Handicap models

Though the handicap principle was initially controversial,—John Maynard Smith was a notable early critic of Zahavi's ideas—it has gained wider acceptance because it is supported by game theoretic models, most notably Alan Grafen's signalling game model.  This is essentially a rediscovery of Michael Spence's job market signalling model, where the job applicant signals their quality by declaring a costly education.  In Grafen's model, the courting male's quality is signalled by investment in an extravagant trait—such as the peacock's tail.  In both cases, the signal is reliable if the cost to the signaller of producing it is proportionately lower for higher-quality signallers than it is for lower-quality signallers (Fig. 2). Having read Grafen's mathematical modeling, Smith accepted the validity of the Handicap Principle.

A series of papers by Thomas Getty shows that Grafen's proof of the handicap principle depends on the critical simplifying assumption that signalers trade off costs for benefits in an additive fashion, the way humans invest money to increase income in the same currency. This is illustrated in the figures to the right, from Johnstone 1997. The validity of this assumption has been contested, in its application to the survival cost–reproduction benefit trade-off that is assumed to mediate the evolution of sexually selected signals. It can be reasoned that as fitness depends on the production of offspring, this is therefore a multiplicative function, not an additive function, of reproductive success.

Further formal game theoretical signalling models demonstrated the evolutionary stability of handicapped signals in nestlings' begging calls, in predator-deterrent signals and in threat-displays. In the classic handicapped models of begging, all players are assumed to pay the same amount to produce a signal of a given level of intensity, but differ in the relative value of eliciting the desired response (donation) from the receiver. The hungrier the baby bird, the more food is of value to it, and the higher the optimal signalling level (the louder its chirping).

Counter-examples to handicap models predate handicap models themselves. Models of signals (such as threat displays) without any handicapping costs show that conventional signalling may be evolutionarily stable in biological communication. Analysis of some begging models also shows that, in addition to the handicapped outcomes, non-communication strategies are not only evolutionarily stable, but lead to higher payoffs for both players. Mathematical analyses including Monte Carlo simulations suggest that costly traits used in mate choice by humans should be generally less common and more attractive to the other sex than non-costly traits.

While Grafen’s model was claimed to support the Handicap Principle it soon turned out that honest signals need not be costly at the honest equilibrium not even under conflict of interest. This conclusion was first shown in discrete models then continuous models as well. Similar result was obtained in conflict models: threat displays need not be handicaps to be honest and evolutionarily stable. In all of these models signals at the honest equilibrium can be cost-free or even beneficial for honest signallers (independent of the receiver’s response).

Generality and empirical examples

The theory predicts that a sexual ornament, or any other signal, such as visibly risky behavior, must be costly if it is to accurately advertise a trait of relevance to an individual with conflicting interests.  Typical examples of handicapped signals include bird songs, the peacock's tail, courtship dances, and bowerbird bowers.  Jared Diamond has proposed that certain risky human behaviours, such as bungee jumping, may be expressions of instincts that have evolved through the operation of the handicap principle.  Zahavi has invoked the potlatch ceremony as a human example of the handicap principle in action.  This interpretation of potlatch can be traced to Thorstein Veblen's use of the ceremony in his book Theory of the Leisure Class as an example of "conspicuous consumption".

The handicap principle gains further support by providing interpretations for behaviours that fit into a single unifying gene-centered view of evolution and making earlier explanations based on group selection obsolete. A classic example is that of stotting in gazelles. This behaviour consists in the gazelle initially running slowly and jumping high when threatened by a predator such as a lion or cheetah. The explanation based on group selection was that such behaviour might be adapted to alerting other gazelle to a cheetah's presence or might be part of a collective behaviour pattern of the group of gazelle to confuse the cheetah. Instead, Zahavi proposed that each gazelle was communicating  that it was a fitter individual than its fellows. This may communicate to the cheetah to avoid chasing this fitter individual, or the message may be oriented toward the other gazelles, which would indicate its fitness to potential mates.

Immunocompetence handicaps

The theory of immunocompetence handicaps suggests that androgen-mediated traits accurately signal condition due to the immunosuppressive effects of androgens.  This immunosuppression may be either because testosterone alters the allocation of limited resources between the development of ornamental traits and other tissues, including the immune system, or because heightened immune system activity has a propensity to launch autoimmune attacks against gametes, such that suppression of the immune system enhances fertility.  Healthy individuals can afford to  suppress their immune system by raising their testosterone levels, which also augments secondary sexual traits and displays.  A review of empirical studies into the various aspects of this theory found weak support.

Examples

Directed at members of the same species

Zahavi studied in particular the Arabian babbler, a very social bird, with a life-length of 30 years, which was considered to have altruistic behaviors. The helping-at-the-nest behavior often occurs among unrelated individuals, and therefore cannot be explained by kin selection. Zahavi reinterpreted these behaviours according to his signal theory and its correlative, the handicap principle. The altruistic act is costly to the donor, but may improve its attractiveness to potential mates. The evolution of this condition may be explained by competitive altruism.

Research by Patrice David on the stalk-eyed fly species Cyrtodiopsis dalmanni has demonstrated that genetic variation underlies the response to environmental stress, such as variable food quality, or of male sexual ornaments, such as increased eye span. David demonstrated that some male genotypes develop large eye spans under all conditions, whereas other genotypes progressively reduce eye spans as environmental conditions deteriorate. Several non-sexual traits, including female eye span and male and female wing length, also show condition-dependent expression, but their genetic response is entirely explained by scaling with body size. Unlike these characteristics, male eye span still reveals genetic variation in response to environmental stress after accounting for differences in body size. Thus, David inferred that these results strongly support the conclusion that female mate choice yields genetic benefits for offspring as eye span acts as a truthful indicator of male fitness. Eye span is therefore not only selected on the basis of attractiveness, but also because it demonstrates good genes in mates.

Directed at other species

The signal receiver need not be a conspecific of the sender, however. Signals may also be directed at predators, with the function of showing that pursuit will probably be unprofitable. Stotting, for instance, is a sort of hopping that certain gazelles do when they sight a predator. As this behavior gives no evident benefit and would seem to waste resources (diminishing the gazelle's head start if chased by the predator), it was a puzzle until handicap theory offered an explanation. According to this analysis, if the gazelle simply invests a little energy to show a lion that it has the fitness necessary to avoid capture, it may not have to evade the lion in an actual pursuit. The lion, faced with the demonstration of fitness, might decide that it will not catch this gazelle, and thus, avoid a wasted pursuit. The benefit to the gazelle is twofold. First, for the small amount of energy invested in the stotting, the gazelle might not have to expend the tremendous energy required to evade the lion. Second, if the lion is in fact capable of catching this gazelle, the gazelle's bluff leads to its survival that day.

Another example is provided by larks, some of which discourage merlins by sending a similar message: they sing while being chased, telling their predator that they will be difficult to capture.

See also
Aposematism
Game theory
Multiple sexual ornaments
Parasite-stress theory
Sacrifice
Signaling game
Signaling theory

References

External links
 Honest Signalling Theory: A Basic Introduction. By Carl T. Bergstrom, University of Washington, 2006.

Animal communication
Ethology
Selection
Sexual selection